Alispahić is a Bosnian surname, derived from Turkish Ali Sipahi. People with the name include:
  (born 1966), Bosnian publicist and journalist
 Kemal Alispahić (born 1965), former Bosnian footballer turned manager
 Mehmed Alispahić (born 1987), Bosnian footballer
  (born 1940), Bosnian writer
 Selma Alispahić (born 1970), Bosnian actress

References

Bosnian surnames
Patronymic surnames